Ridley's may refer to:

 Ridley's Brewery
 Ridley's Family Markets

See also
 Ridley (disambiguation)